This is a list of adult fiction books that topped The New York Times Fiction Best Seller list in 1966.

Only three novels topped the list that year, which was dominated by Jacqueline Susann's Valley of the Dolls which spent 28 weeks at the top of the list and 65 weeks in the top 10. Valley was toppled by Robert Crichton's The Secret of Santa Vittoria, a World War II story based on fact, which sold more than 100,000 copies in the first month of its release. It spent 18 weeks at the top of the list and nearly a year in the top 10. The other top seller of the year, James Michener's The Source, spent 36 weeks at the top of the list in 1965 and 1966.

References

1966
.
1966 in the United States